Odocoileini is a tribe of deer, containing seven extant genera and several extinct ones.

The common character of this tribe is vomerine septum that completely separates the choana.

Phylogeny
Phylogeny by Gilbert et al. 2006 and Duarte et al. 2008, that showed Mazama is polyphyletic.

References 

Cervinae
Mammal tribes